Bernarda Pera (born 3 December 1994) is a Croatian-born American tennis player. Pera has won two singles titles and one doubles title on the WTA Tour, along with nine singles and eight doubles titles on the ITF Circuit. She achieved career-high rankings of world No. 43 in singles on September 19, 2022, and No. 35 in doubles on February 21, 2022.

Early life
Bernarda was born in a Croatian-Dalmatian Italian family. Besides English, she speaks Croatian as well. When she was 16, her father, who is a U.S. citizen, moved their family to the United States for the benefit of her budding tennis career. They settled in New Jersey, where it wasn’t hard for them to adjust because they already had friends and relatives there.
Pera has been in a relationship with Croatian basketball player Kristijan Krajina since 2018.

Career

2014
She made her WTA Tour debut at the 2014 US Open, having been handed a wildcard into the doubles draw, partnering with Tornado Alicia Black.

2018: Australian Open and top 100 debut
She made her Grand Slam singles debut at the Australian Open, where she received entry as a lucky loser, after Margarita Gasparyan withdrew from the tournament. In the second round of the same tournament, Pera knocked out ninth seed Johanna Konta. In the third round, she was beaten by Barbora Strýcová.

2020: Top 60 debut in singles
Pera started her 2020 season at the Brisbane International where she lost in the first round of qualifying to Marta Kostyuk. Coming through qualifying at the first edition of the Adelaide International, she beat Barbora Strýcová in the first round and was defeated in the second by sixth seed Aryna Sabalenka. At the Australian Open, she lost in the first round to 29th seed Elena Rybakina.

Making it through qualifying in Doha, Pera was defeated in the second round by third seed and 2017 champion, Karolína Plíšková. Seeded third at the Indian Wells Challenger, she lost in the third round to 13th seed Misaki Doi. The WTA Tour cancelled tournaments from March through July due to the COVID-19 pandemic.

When the WTA resumed tournament play in August, Pera competed at the Lexington Challenger where she was eliminated in the first round by top seed Serena Williams. At the Cincinnati Open, she was defeated in the second round by 16th seed Dayana Yastremska. At the US Open, she reached the second round but lost to 15th seed Maria Sakkari.

In Rome at the Italian Open, Pera was defeated in the first round by Svetlana Kuznetsova. At the Internationaux de Strasbourg, she lost in the first round to Kateřina Siniaková. She suffered a second-round loss at Roland Garros by the hands of 25th seed and compatriot, Amanda Anisimova.

At the first edition of the Ostrava Open, Pera lost in the first round of qualifying to Tereza Martincová. Seeded eighth at the Linz Open, she was defeated in the first round by Aliaksandra Sasnovich.

Pera ended the year ranked 61.

2021: Major doubles semifinal & top 50
Pera kicked off her 2021 season at the first edition of the Abu Dhabi Open where she beat 16th seed, Donna Vekić, in the first round before she lost to Sara Sorribes Tormo. At the first edition of the Gippsland Trophy, she was defeated in the second round by fifth seed Johanna Konta. At the Australian Open, she eliminated 23rd seed and 2016 champion, Angelique Kerber, in the first round. In the second, she fell to Zarina Diyas. In Adelaide, she lost in the first round of qualifying to Storm Sanders.

In March, Pera played at the Dubai Tennis Championships where she was defeated in the first round by Anastasija Sevastova. At Miami, she lost in round one to Sara Sorribes Tormo.

Starting into the clay-court season at the Charleston Open, Pera fell in the first round to Alizé Cornet. At Istanbul, she faced third seed Veronika Kudermetova in the first round; after pushing her to three sets, she ended up losing the match. Getting past qualifying at the Madrid Open, she was defeated in the second round by eighth seed Belinda Bencic. Making it through the qualifying rounds in Rome, she lost her second-round encounter against 12th seed Garbiñe Muguruza. Competing at the first edition of the Emilia-Romagna Open, she was defeated in the first round by seventh seed Sorribes Tormo. At the French Open, she took top seed and 2019 champion, Ashleigh Barty, to three sets but ended up losing her first-round match. In doubles, she and Magda Linette reached semifinals in which they lost to second seeds Barbora Krejčíková and Kateřina Siniaková.

Getting past qualifying at Eastbourne, Pera was defeated in the first round by top seed and 2018 finalist, Aryna Sabalenka. At Wimbledon, she lost in the first round to Nao Hibino.

After Wimbledon, Pera played at the Hamburg European Open. Seeded seventh, she was defeated in the second round by Ysaline Bonaventure. Seeded third at the Budapest Grand Prix, she lost in the second round to eventual finalist, Anhelina Kalinina.

In August, Pera traveled to Montreal to play the Canadian Open where she was defeated in the first round of qualifying by Harriet Dart. In doubles at the same tournament, she reached her first WTA 1000 semifinal with Magda Linette.

At the Cincinnati Open, she lost in the second round to eventual finalist Jil Teichmann. Before the final Grand Slam championship of the year, she competed at the first edition of the Cleveland Open where she was defeated in the first round by fifth seed Nadia Podoroska. At the US Open, she lost her first-round match to Tamara Zidanšek.

2022: First WTA titles, career-high rankings
Pera won her first WTA Tour title in doubles, at the Melbourne Summer Set 2, alongside Kateřina Siniaková. As a result, she reached world No. 35 in doubles on 21 February 2022.

Coming into the Budapest Grand Prix, Pera had only won two out of seven main-draw matches in 2022, was on a five-match losing streak, and had to play in qualifying once again due to being ranked No. 130 in the world. However, she defeated Marina Bassols Ribera, fifth seed Aliaksandra Sasnovich, Elisabetta Cocciaretto, and ninth seed Anna Bondar to reach her first WTA Tour singles final in her career as a qualifier. She then defeated Aleksandra Krunić to win her maiden WTA tournament singles title. As a result, she returned to the top 100 in the singles rankings. 

She reached a second consecutive final at the Hamburg European Open by beating the defending champion Elena Ruse, and Joanne Züger, Kateřina Siniaková, and Maryna Zanevska. She then defeated top seed and world No. 2, Anett Kontaveit, in the final, for her second career top-10 win and her second WTA singles title, stretching her winning streak to 12 matches and 24 consecutive sets. Pera also became the first American woman to win multiple clay-court titles in the same season since Serena Williams won five in 2013. With this result, she climbed to a new career-high singles ranking of No. 54.
On 26 August, she reached semifinals of Cleveland where she lost to Liudmila Samsonova, in straight sets. Along the way, she defeated Barbora Krejčíková and Sofia Kenin, both former winners of major titles.

Performance timelines

Only main-draw results in WTA Tour, Grand Slam tournaments, Fed Cup/Billie Jean King Cup and Olympic Games are included in win–loss records.

Singles
Current after the 2023 Dubai Open.

Doubles
Current after the 2023 Australian Open.

WTA career finals

Singles: 2 (2 titles)

Doubles: 1 (1 title)

WTA Challenger finals

Singles: 2 (2 runner-ups)

ITF Circuit finals

Singles: 20 (9 titles, 11 runner–ups)

Doubles: 15 (8 titles, 7 runner–ups)

Head-to-head records

Record against top 10 players
Pera's record against players who have been ranked in the top 10. Active players are in boldface.

Top 10 wins

Longest winning streak

16-match win streak (2022)

Notes

References

External links
 
 

1994 births
Living people
Croatian emigrants to the United States
Croatian female tennis players
American female tennis players
Croatian expatriate sportspeople in Spain
American expatriate sportspeople in Spain
American people of Italian descent
Dalmatian Italians
People with acquired American citizenship
Sportspeople from Zadar
21st-century American women